John Smith MacIvor (March 27, 1913 – June 12, 1957) was a lawyer and political figure in Nova Scotia, Canada. He represented Cape Breton South in the Nova Scotia House of Assembly from 1945 to 1956 as a Liberal member.

He was born in Glace Bay, Nova Scotia, the son of Malcolm MacIvor and Catherine Smith. He was educated at Acadia University and Dalhousie University. MacIvor practiced law in Sydney and served as provincial magistrate from 1942 to 1945. He was chosen as speaker for the provincial assembly in 1954.

References 
 Canadian Parliamentary Guide, 1956, PG Normandin
 John Smith MacIvor's burial information

1913 births
1957 deaths
Acadia University alumni
Dalhousie University alumni
Nova Scotia Liberal Party MLAs
People from Glace Bay
Speakers of the Nova Scotia House of Assembly